Krantivira Sangolli Rayanna - Bengaluru Station, commonly known as KSR Bengaluru Station, Bengaluru City Railway Station or Bangalore City Railway Station (station code: SBC) is the main railway station serving the city of Bengaluru, Karnataka, India. It is the busiest railway station in South Western Railway zone of Indian Railways.

It is located across the Kempegowda Bus Station. The station has 10 platforms and three entrances.

History 
The establishment of the British cantonment in 1809 made Bangalore a crucial military hub in South India. Soon enough, a need arose to establish more transportation links between the new civil and military outpost with the colonial administrative headquarters in Madras. In the 1840s, proposals for these railway lines were debated in the British Parliament, a move supported by traders and shipping companies. In Bangalore, Sir Mark Cubbon pushed for the development of the railway link during his tenure as the Commissioner of Mysore and Coorg. He proposed a railroad project connecting Mysore and Madras through Bangalore and Calicut but the plan was stalled. The line was initially meant for military purposes -for transporting soldiers, grains and ammunition but was later made open to the public. Lewin Bentham Bowring took over as the commissioner of Mysore and the land for the railway project was donated by the Mysore government. The train that chugged from Cantonment was called 'Bangalore Mail', which is the oldest running train in Indian Railways. The year 1864 also saw other crucial developments in Bangalore. The railway link was a turning point in the history of the city as it encouraged immigration from the rest of the country. Trade witnessed a huge boost, and many potters from Madras also settled down in the Cantonment around the same time, leading to the establishment of Pottery Town.

In 1944, the rail network was nationalised. On 14 April 1951, the three major networks administered by the erstwhile Madras and Southern Maratha Railway, the Southern Indian Railway and Mysore State Railway were joined to form Southern Railway.

Due to historical reasons, the headquarters of the erstwhile Mysore State Railway was located in Mysore though Bangalore was the hub of operations. To improve administration and enhance monitoring, Bangalore Division was inaugurated on 27 July 1981.

The metre-gauge lines bound to Hubli, Mysore were converted into broad gauge in the 1990s.

In 2015 it was decided to rename the station; three stations in the city were using Bangaluru in their name. The station was renamed Krantiveera Sangolli Rayanna station in 2016. The station has numerous licensed food stalls, modernised digital lockers, facilities for the disabled, and child-friendly spaces which will also accommodate trafficked children.

Platforms 

Platforms 1 connects to the Chennai and Salem railway lines. On platforms 8 to 10, service trains arrive via Yeshwantpur from Hubballi-Dharwad. Platforms 1 to 4 terminate at Bangalore. On platforms 5 to 10, service trains depart towards Mysuru. There are railway lines between Platforms 4 and 5 that are used as the railway yard. There are 5 railway lines passing from Bangalore City railway station – to Hyderabad via Guntakal, Chennai via Krishnarajapuram, Salem via Hosur, Mysuru, Hubballi-Dharwad via Tumkur, Birur. The Bangalore–Chennai railway line via Bangalore Cantonment, Bangarpet, is fully electrified and open for traffic. The Bangalore–Mysore line is also doubled and electrified.

Connections 
The railway station is served by City Railway Station metro station on the Namma Metro's Purple Line, which opened on 30 April 2016. Later that year, the Bangalore Metro Rail Corporation Limited (BMRCL) decided to construct a foot overbridge from the metro station until the boundary of the railway station, while the South Western Railway, would complete the rest of the work. The foot overbridge connecting platform 10 with the metro station was opened on 18 February 2019. The BMRC reported that monthly ridership at the metro station was 175,000 passengers per day prior to opening the bridge, and increased to 250,000 two months after its opening.

The railway station is also served by Kempegowda Bus Station.

Important trains 
The important trains originating and passing from Bangalore city station are KSR Bengaluru Mail, Kacheguda-Mysuru Express, Karnataka Express, Bangalore Miraj Rani Chennamma Express, Island Express, Chennai Shatabdi Express, Rajdhani Express, Lal Bagh Express, Chennai-Mysuru Vande Bharat Express, Brindavan Express and Wodeyar Express, Humsafar Express, Duronto Express.

Aquatic Kingdom 

The station features a public aquarium called ′Aquatic Kingdom′ which is functional since 1 July 2021. It includes a 12-foot-long tunnel aquarium,  which is India's first. It is developed in collaboration with HNI Aquatic Kingdom.

See also 
 Mysore–Bangalore railway line

References

External links 

 

Railway stations in Bangalore
Bangalore railway division
Railway junction stations in Karnataka